Carlos Alberto Melconian (born November 6,1956) is an Argentine economist and politician. He served as president of the Banco de la Nacion Argentina from December 23, 2015, to 18 January 2017.

Education and Career 
He has a degree in Economics from the University of Buenos Aires Faculty of Economic Sciences, and a master's degree in Economics from the Torcuato Di Tella University.

In the 1980s he worked in the  Economic Investigations unit of the Central Bank of the Argentine Republic.

References 

1956 births
Living people
Argentine people of Armenian descent
People from Buenos Aires Province
Argentine economists
People from Lanús